Marco Frapporti (born 30 March 1985) is an Italian racing cyclist, who last rode for UCI ProTeam .

Major results

2005
 3rd Circuito del Porto
2006
 6th Trofeo Città di Brescia
2007
 1st Giro del Canavese
 1st Piccolo Giro di Lombardia
 10th Coppa Colli Briantei
2008
 2nd Gran Premio Industria e Commercio di Prato
2009
 7th Overall Giro della Provincia di Grosseto
1st Stage 2
 7th Gran Premio della Costa Etruschi
 8th Hel van het Mergelland
 8th Overall Tour of Turkey
2010
 5th Gran Premio Bruno Beghelli
 10th Overall Tour of Britain
1st Stage 5
2011
 1st Stage 1 Brixia Tour
2012
 6th Gran Premio della Costa Etruschi
 6th Trofeo Laigueglia
 6th Giro di Toscana
 7th Overall Giro della Provincia di Reggio Calabria
2013
 1st Stage 4 Route du Sud
 3rd Grand Prix of Aargau Canton
 6th Giro dell'Appennino
2016
 2nd Overall Four Days of Dunkirk
2017
 2nd Gran Premio di Lugano
2018
 6th Coppa Bernocchi

Grand Tour general classification results timeline

References

External links

1985 births
Living people
Italian male cyclists
Cyclists from the Province of Brescia